Stormers San Lorenzo is the oldest football club from Potosí that plays in the Potosí Primera A, one of the third division regional leagues. The club was founded on May 26, 1897 and plays its home games at the Estadio Serafín Ferreira.

Association football clubs established in 1897
Football clubs in Bolivia
1897 establishments in Bolivia